Thomas I (? – 21 March 610) was the Ecumenical Patriarch of Constantinople from 607 to 610. He has been canonized a saint in the Eastern Orthodox Church. His feast day is 21 March for those churches which follow the Julian Calendar, 21 March falls on 3 April of the modern Gregorian Calendar).

External links
St Thomas the Patriarch of Constantinople Orthodox icon and synaxarion

7th-century patriarchs of Constantinople
7th-century Christian saints